Cleostratoides is a genus of ground-hoppers (Orthoptera: Caelifera) in the subfamily Metrodorinae and not assigned to any tribe.

The genus is currently considered monotypic, with the species Cleostratoides exoticus Storozhenko, 2013 found in Vietnam: the type locality was Buon Luoi village, Gia Lai Province.

References

External links 
 

Tetrigidae
Caelifera genera
Orthoptera of Indo-China
Monotypic Orthoptera genera